Graf Ernst Friedrich Herbert zu Münster (born 1 March 1766 Osnabrück; died 20 May 1839 Hanover) was a German statesman, politician and minister in the service of the House of Hanover.

Biography
Ernst zu Münster was born the son of Georg  zu  (1721–1773), Hofmarschall of the Prince-Bishopric of Osnabrück, and his second wife Eleonore. Count Münster studied at Göttingen University together with the three youngest sons of King George III. He entered the public service in the Electorate of Hanover. One of his first tasks was to bring Prince Augustus Frederick, Duke of Sussex and his company home from Italy. Later he was appointed minister for the affairs of Hanover in London (the German Chancery) in 1805 following Ernst Ludwig von Lenthe. At the Congress of Vienna (1815) he had to care for the German assets of the House of Hanover which he successfully did. The electorate became the Kingdom of Hanover and gained territories at the North Sea, partially ruled earlier in personal union, such as the Duchies of Bremen-Verden and partially ruled by others, to wit East Frisia. However, the bulk of another duchy ruled before the Napoleonic Wars in personal union, Saxe-Lauenburg north of the river Elbe was assigned in personal union to Denmark. He stayed in office until 1831.

Family

Münster was married to Countess Wilhelmine Charlotte of Lippe-Alverdissen (1783–1858), daughter of Philip II, Count of Schaumburg-Lippe and sister of George William, Prince of Schaumburg-Lippe ; he was survived by his wife and son (later Prince) Georg Herbert Münster when he died in 1839.

References

Notes

External links

 
 Kulturzentrum Glashaus Gut Derneburg

1766 births
1839 deaths
18th-century German politicians
19th-century German politicians
German diplomats
Lower Saxon nobility
Counts of Germany
People from the Electorate of Hanover
People from the Kingdom of Hanover
Politicians from Osnabrück
Honorary Knights Grand Cross of the Order of the Bath
M